Dnyaneshwar Mulay – ज्ञानेश्वर मुळे (Jñānēśvar Muḷē), an Indian Career Diplomat who superannuated after 35 years of service, was appointed by the President of India as the Member, National Human Rights Commission in April 2019.  He joined the Indian Foreign Service in 1983 and has since served in several capacities, including the Consul General of India, New York, and the High Commissioner of India, Male, Maldives.
He is a successful writer and has written over 15 books, which have been translated in Arabic, Dhivehi, Urdu, Kannada and Hindi. His magnum-opus – Maati, Pankh ani Akash, written in Marathi, has received immense popularity and has also been prescribed in the Arts curriculum at the North Maharasthra University, Jalgaon (Maharashtra).
He has inspired a number of socio-educational projects including Balodyan, an orphanage in his native village, and the Dnyaneshwar Mulay Education Society, which seeks to introduce innovative concepts like Global Education.

Early life, education and struggles
Mulay was born in 1958, in the village of Lat, in the Kolhapur district of Maharashtra in a marathi family. His father Manohar Krishna Mulay was a farmer and tailor while his mother Akkatai Mulay has been a homemaker. He completed his primary education in the village of Lat, at the age of 10, he left the village to join Rajarshi Shahu Chatrapati Vidyaniketan, Kolhapur, a school that was founded by the Zilla Parishad, to nurture talent from rural areas. He became the first student from rural area, to win the Jagannath Shankarsheth Award, by securing highest marks in Sanskrit at SSC exam in 1975.

He received his BA (English Literature) degree from the Shahaji Chattrapati College Kolhapur and stood first in the University for which he also won the prestigious Dhananjay Keer Award. 
Seeking to join the civil services, and realizing that there was a dearth of study resources and guidance in Kolhapur, he relocated to Mumbai. In Mumbai he joined the State Institute for Administrative Career, which provided him the basic facilities for his studies. He also studied Master's in Labour Studies from LNML MILS in Mumbai.

In the meantime, he studied Personnel Management at the Mumbai University, and won the Peter Alvarez medal for standing first in the University 
He stood first in the Maharashtra Public Service Commission (MPSC) examination in the year 1982, and succeeded in the Union Public Service Commission (UPSC) examination before being selected in the Indian foreign service.

In January 2017, the D.Y Patil University of Mumbai honoured him with Doctor of Literature (honoris causa) for his 'exemplary contribution to society'.

Early career

He joined office as the Deputy Collector of Pune and later joined the Indian Foreign Service in 1983. He first served in Tokyo as the Third secretary and later as the Second Secretary of the Indian Embassy to Japan. During his tenure in Japan, Mulay very successfully managed the ambitious Cultural extravaganza, Festival of India, which was organised in over 20 cities of Japan over a period of one year in 1988. He also founded the Indian Business Association in Moscow, Russia and was its Founder president for two years. During his stint as Second Secretary in Japan, he looked after economic relations and paved the way for many Japanese investments in India including from Toyota Motors, NTT-Itochu, Honda Motors and YKK.

He has served in various capacities in Russia, Mauritius, and then in Syria as the minister in the Indian embassy. He has been instrumental in handling the business relations between India and Russia particularly the transition from the state controlled (rupee - rouble) trade to direct trade. In Syria, he facilitated the Sahitya Akademy's first M.O.U. outside India with the Arab Writers Association. In Mauritius he streamlined and expedited the Cyber Tower project and Rajiv Gandhi Science Centre, with Indian assistance.

High Commissioner of India to Male (Maldives)

He assumed office as the high commissioner of India to Male (Maldives) in April 2009 and served in this capacity until March 2013. He is credited with steering the Indo-Maldivian relations to a new level and has successfully led the embassy through the difficult transfer of power, in February 2012.

He was also instrumental in strengthening the military relationship between India and the Maldives, notably achieving the India -Maldives- Sri Lanka cooperation in the maritime arena. He handled the difficult situation during the two-week-long refuge of President Mohamed Nasheed in the Indian High Commission in Male. The Indian Cultural Centre in Maldives was established with his initiative.

Consul General of India, New York, USA

He began service as the Consul General of India on 23 April 2013. His notable achievements at the Consulate include the varied initiatives of outreach to the Indian diaspora as well as the mainstream American society. He introduced a monthly lecture series called 'Media India 2014', which gained immense popularity, while also helping create new conversations on India. Another similar lecture series focussing on the Indian states and named 'India-State by State' was also received well. He also helped establish a film and Literature Club in order to introduce Indian movies and literature to the American population. During his tenure as the Consul General, he has also appeared on Comedy Central's 'The Daily Show with Jon Stewart, in a hilarious episode based on India's elections.

In response to the Swachh Bharat Abhiyan, announced by Prime Minister of India Narendra Modi, Mulay initiated a Swachh Consulate campaign in New York. This holistic cleansing campaign has set a model of Swachh Consulate campaign for other Indian missions abroad. Mulay also launched the Consulate at Your Doorstep outreach program with the aim of deepening understanding of US decision-makers on India-US relations and addressing the concerns of the community on passports, visas and other matters. Monthly lecture series 'Media India' was another innovative initiative he has started as a Consul General of India in New York.

Movement of Positivity 
On February 2, 2019 a day after his service was over with the Government of India as a Secretary in the Ministry of External Affairs , he started  “Movement of Positivity” aimed at realizing the values of equality , justice and freedom of every citizen. It’s to be achieved through creativity, compassion and constructive approach in a democratic framework and constitutional means.

Academic, media and literary work 

In the recent past he has contributed a regular column to Loksatta in Marathi titled "Badalate Vishwa – Badalata Bharat - बदलते विश्व - बदलता भारत ” and "Vishwachi Maze Ghar - विश्वची माझे घर" in Sakal. These columns provide fresh perspectives and insights into various aspects of current global and national challenges and opportunities. In 2015, he wrote 'Manhattan Postcard' for the Sakal Times, and in 2016 his appeared in the Daily Lokmat.
In 2004–2006 he wrote a column in the Sadhana Weekly in Marathi. This column titled "Nokarshaiche Rang - नोकरशाहीचे रंग", meaning The ' Colours of Bureaucratic Ink' was later published by Sadhana Weekly in the book format. The column threw light on the working of the Bureaucracy in democratic India. From January 2012 he is writing another column titled "Phoolonke Rangase - फुलोंके रंगसे".
He also contributes to the Hindu newspaper's literary pages in English and to the daily Dainik Bhaskar in Hindi.
He has written several features and human-interest stories in several journals, periodicals, etc. in English, Japanese and Marathi (Sakal, Lokmat, Maharashtra Times, Antarnad, Sadhana, etc.).
Portions from his writing was included in text books in Karnataka and Japan.
Members of advisory boards of sahitya akademi (2008–2012)

Contribution in Marathi literature 

Nokarshahiche Rang "नोकरशाईचे रंग ” (2009) – A autobiographical book on life experiences in various places and countries.
Gyanbachi Mekh "ग्यानबाची मेख ” (2009) Collection of Essays – A wide range of subjects covered from environment to education and tourism to social welfare.
Translated Shri Radha "श्री राधा” (2008) – A Poetry of Ramakant Rath into Marathi
Swatahteel Awakash "स्वताहातील अवकाश" (2006) – A Marathi poetry collection, published by Granthali, Mumbai, September 2006. These contemporary poems deal with every dimension of the world from terrorism to technology and environment to economic issues. He received the Maharashtra government's "Sayaji rao Gaikwad" award for best poetry for this collection, in the year 2007.
Russia Navya Dishanche Amantran "रशिया – नव्या दिशांचे आमंत्रण"(2006) – A book that examines Russia after 1985 and showcases the changes and growth of the country. It is based on the author's first-hand experiences in Russia during 1992–95.
Rastach Vegala Dharala "रस्ताच वेगळा धरला” (2005) – A collection of poetry in Marathi dealing with social, political and international issues like poverty, peace, corruption, etc.
Manoos Ani Mukkam "माणूस आणि मुक्काम" (2004) – A book of essays on Delhi, Japan, Mauritius and Damascus centring on people, places and experience.
Door Rahila Gaon "दूर राहिला गाव" (2000) – An epic poem that stretches over 250 stanzas in rhyme. A faraway soul remembers the bygone years spent in his idyllic village. The poem is both romantic and melancholic, and focusses on the theme of nostalgia. It is, however, a very modern poem in terms of expression, style and contents.
Maati, Pankh aani Aakash “'माती पंख आणि आकाश'” (1998) – Autobiographical novel in Marathi –The protagonist, a boy from a small village, a first generation school-goer rapidly climbs the success ladder and joins the coveted diplomatic service. The journey of the boy brings out issues of rural urban disparity, the role of education in development, the challenge of corruption in the administration and the emergence of Indian democracy. The book won many awards including Kaushik award from Satara for best literary work of the year and is translated in Kannada, Hindi and English. In July 2021 his Book ‘Mati Pankh Ani Akash’ was announced award of The Best Book for translation category. 
Jonaki "जोनाकी”(1984) – Collection of poetry in Marathi – Passionate poems of a young and sensitive mind, which try to fathom the hidden meanings of social, political, cultural and economic happenings of the times. The growing aspirations of a new generation born in the post-independence India are the highlights of the collection. Translated in Hindi in 1995.
Akash Mandap Prithivi Aasan "आकाश मंडप पृथिवी आसन "(2010) - Collection of Essays 
Sakal .. ji hot naahee "सकाळ .. जी होत नाही" ( 2018 ) - Poems on the Middle East

Contribution in Hindi literature 
 Ritu Ug Rahi Hai "ऋतू उग राही है" (1999) – A collection of poems in Hindi. The challenges of contemporary life brought in by disparities among nations, the technological divide, globalisation and personal dilemmas of love, and separation, communication are the central themes of the collection. A graceful, direct and new approach to poetry, breaking from the past in form and substance.
 Andar Ek Asmaan "अन्दर एक आसमान"(Urdu 2002) – A collection of poems in Urdu. The poem addresses Socio-political themes as well as dwell on technological development of our times.
 Man Ke Khalihanomein "मन की खलिहानोमें"(2005) – Hindi Poetry Collection. Pioneering poetry on themes of globalisation and individual's response to the same.
 Subah hai ki hoti nahin "सुबाह है की होती नहीं" (2008) – A collection of poems on the Middle East situation in Hindi and Urdu.
 Shanti ki Afwayen "शांती कि अफ़वाये “ (2017) – A collection of Hindi poems.

Contribution in English literature 
 Ahlan wa- Sahlan- A Syrian Journey (2006) -A book on Syria's civilisation, charm and contemporary life, written jointly with Sadhna Shanker and published in English, Arabic and Hindi
 A comparative study of Post-World War-II Japanese and post-independence Marathi Poetry (2002) – A diagnostic review of the similarities and contrast of poetry of Japan and India. The study was done as a Fellow of the Ministry of Human Resource Development (India).
And the Gypsy learned to fly (2018) -Award-winning Autobiography 
Silent Chaos (2018) -Collection of poems on Middle East

Books and films based on his life 
 In 2015, a documentary titled 'Gypsy', highlighting the life and work of Dnyaneshwar Mulay, was produced by Director Dhananjay Bhawalekar. The film received the 'Special Jury Award' at the Delhi Short Film Documentary Festival.
 In January 2016, the well-known writer Deepa Deshmukh authored a book titled 'Dr. Dnyaneshwar Mulay – Passport Man of India'.

Personal life 
Dr Dnyaneshwar Mulay lives in Delhi, with his wife Sadhna Shanker who is an Indian Revenue Service officer. He has three children Utsav, Agney and Pujya.

See also
 Indian literature
 Indian Foreign Service
 Indo-Maldivian relations

References

1958 births
Living people
Indian diplomats
Marathi-language writers
Hindi-language poets
People from Kolhapur district
Shivaji University alumni